Love All the Hurt Away is the twenty-seventh studio album by American singer Aretha Franklin. Released in August 20,1981 ,this album is the singer's second release under the Arista Records label.  The Arif Mardin-produced disc reached fourth place on Billboard's R&B albums chart and number 36 on the main Billboard album chart, selling roughly 250,000 copies in the US.

Background
Franklin's cover version of Sam & Dave's classic hit "Hold On! I'm Comin'" won Franklin her 11th Grammy Award in the Best R&B Vocal Performance, Female category. The award was her first Grammy win since 1975. After its original release, the album was re-issued on CD in 2012 by Cherry Red Records and it also included three bonus tracks.

Track listing 
Credits adapted from the liner notes of Love All The Hurt Away.

Personnel

Musicians

 Aretha Franklin – lead and backing vocals, piano, BGV arrangements (2, 4, 6, 7), rhythm arrangements (7–9)
 David Foster – keyboards (1, 3)
 Robbie Buchanan – keyboards (2, 4)
 Greg Phillinganes – keyboards (2–7, 10)
 David Paich – piano, Fender Rhodes (5, 7–9)
 Buzz Feiten – guitar (1, 7)
 David Williams – guitar (2–9, 10)
 Steve Lukather – guitar (5–9)
 Louis Johnson – bass guitar (1, 3)
 Marcus Miller – bass guitar (2, 4, 5, 7–10)
 Abraham Laboriel – bass guitar (6)
 Jeff Porcaro – drums (1-10)
 Paulinho da Costa – percussion (1, 3, 5) 
 Steve Ferrone – percussion (7)
 Eddie Daniels – alto saxophone (1)
 Ronnie Cuber – saxophone (2, 3, 8–10)
 Jim Horn – saxophone (2, 3, 8–10)
 Gary Herbig – saxophone (2, 3, 8–10)
 Seldon Powell – saxophone (2, 3, 8–10)
 William Slapin – saxophone (2, 3, 8–10)
 Larry Williams – saxophone (2, 3, 8–10), horn arrangements (2, 8, 9), string arrangements (8, 9)
 Bill Reichenbach Jr. – trombone (2, 3, 8–10)
 Urbie Green – trombone (2, 3, 8–10)
 Gary Grant – trumpet (2, 3, 8–10)
 Jon Faddis – trumpet (2, 3, 8–10)
 Jerry Hey – trumpet  (2, 3, 8–10), horn arrangements (2, 3), string arrangements (3, 6)
 Joe Shepley – trumpet  (2, 3, 8–10)
 Arif Mardin – arrangements (1, 4), rhythm arrangements (2, 7–9), string arrangements (6, 10), horn arrangements (8, 9, 10)
 Rod Temperton – BGV arrangements (3), horn arrangements (3), rhythm arrangements (3), string arrangements (3)
 Gene Orloff – concertmaster (3, 6, 8–10)
 Harry Bluestone – concertmaster (3, 6, 8–10)
 George Benson – lead vocals (1)
 Marci Levy – backing vocals (1, 3–5, 7, 8)
 Mark Stevens – backing vocals (1, 3–5)
 Margaret Branch – backing vocals (2, 4–6)
 Estelle Brown – backing vocals (2, 4, 6, 7)
 Cissy Houston – backing vocals (2, 4, 6, 7)
 Darlene Love – backing vocals (2, 4, 6, 7)
 David Lasley – backing vocals (4, 5)
 Arnold McCuller – backing vocals (4, 5)
 Jo Ann Harris – backing vocals (5, 7, 8)
 Myrna Smith – backing vocals (6, 7)
 Lynda Laurence – backing vocals (7, 8)

Production
 Producers – Arif Mardin (Tracks 1–10); Aretha Franklin (Tracks 7, 9 & 10).
 Production Coordination – Frank DeCaro
 Production Assistant – Chrissy Allerdings 
 Engineer – Jeremy Smith
 Assistant Engineers – Terry Christian, Steve McManus, Michael O'Reilly and Jim Simon.
 Mixing on Tracks 2 & 5 – Lew Hahn, Arif Mardin and Michael O'Reilly.
 Recorded at Cherokee Studios, Wally Heider Studios and Sunset Sound (Los Angeles, CA); Atlantic Studios (New York, NY).
 Cover Concept – Aretha Franklin
 Art Direction and Design – Ria Lewerke-Shapiro
 Photography – George Hurrell

References

1981 albums
Aretha Franklin albums
Albums produced by Arif Mardin
Arista Records albums